The 2016–17 Nationalliga A (NLA) is the 68th season of the Swiss Handball League, Swiss's top-tier handball league. A total of ten teams contest this season's league, which began on 31 August 2016 and is scheduled to conclude in May 2017.

Kadetten Schaffhausen are the defending champions, having beaten Wacker Thun 3–2 in the previous season's playoff finals.

Format
The competition format for the 2016–17 season consists of two phases, both played in a home-and-away double round-robin system. The first six teams qualifies for a first play-off round, while the last four plays relegation round. At the end of this second round, the first four teams of the play-off round plays elimination rounds.

Teams

The following 10 clubs compete in the Nationalliga A during the 2016–17 season. Lakers Stäfa was relegated from the previous season and HSC Suhr Aarau was promoted from 2015-16 Nationalliga B.

First phase

Standings

Results

Second phase

The points obtained during the regular season were kept for this second phase.

Play-off group

Relegation group

Play-offs

Relegation Round 

TSV Fortitudo Gossau won 54-50 aggregate and stays in Nationalliga A.

References

External links
 Swiss Handball League

Switzerland
Handball competitions in Switzerland
2016 in Swiss sport
2017 in Swiss sport